Yushu may refer to:

China
Yushu Tibetan Autonomous Prefecture, Qinghai
Yushu City, Qinghai, seat of Yushu Prefecture
Gyêgu or Yushu Town, seat of Yushu City
Yushu, Jilin, city in Jilin
Yushu Subdistrict, Panjin (zh), in Dawa District, Panjin, Liaoning
Yushu, Harbin (zh), town in and subdivision of Daoli District, Harbin, Heilongjiang

Iran
Yushu, Iran, in South Khorasan Province
Yushu, alternate name of Yush, South Khorasan